The 2014 Copa Serrana (also known as the 2014 Copa Paulo Sérgio Poletto in this edition, in posthumous tribute) was the 2nd season of the Copa Serrana, a domestic cup in Rio Grande do Sul football, which is a knockout cup competition. The tournament began on 3 August and ended on 16 November with the final second leg.

In this year, seven clubs located in the mountainous region and northern of the state decided to participate in the Copa Serrana, which varies in number of participants according to the interest of clubs in the first, second and third divisions of the Campeonato Gaúcho. This time, Juventude decided to play the competition with the first team squad of his academy, the under-20s team, because of his participation in the Campeonato Brasileiro Série C.

The current holders are Passo Fundo, having won the title in the last edition, being the first champion in history. However, decided to not play the competition this year.

Format
In the first stage, all teams face off in round-robin, which will qualify the top four for the next phase, known as the semi-finals. At this stage, the first placed facing the fourth place and second place playing against the third placed in two matches each. The winners face off in the final two matches to define the winner of the competition.

The 2014 Copa Serrana winners qualify for the 2014 Super Copa Gaúcha, where it will have the opportunity to qualify for 2015 Campeonato Brasileiro Série D. The winner of the Super Copa Gaúcha also dispute the 2015 Recopa Gaúcha, against the winner of 2014 Campeonato Gaúcho at the beginning of next season.

Clubs
The following seven clubs compete in the Copa Serrana during the 2014 edition.

First round

Standings

Matches

Records and statistics

Goalscorers
Are exposed here the goalscorers of the competition.

References

External links
FGF website. Federação Gaúcha de Futebol.

Football competitions in Rio Grande do Sul
State football cup competitions in Brazil
2014 domestic association football cups